Ralph Lester Churchfield (January 1, 1918 – October 7, 1995) was an American professional basketball player. Churchfield played in the National Basketball League for the Pittsburgh Raiders in 1944–45 and averaged 3.4 points per game.

References

1918 births
1995 deaths
Amateur Athletic Union men's basketball players
American men's basketball players
Basketball players from Pittsburgh
Forwards (basketball)
Guards (basketball)
High school basketball coaches in the United States
Pittsburgh Raiders players
Washington & Jefferson Presidents men's basketball players